Atelecyclus is a genus of crab in the family Atelecyclidae, containing two species:
Atelecyclus rotundatus (Olivi, 1792)
Atelecyclus undecimdentatus (Herbst, 1783)

References

Cancroidea
Decapod genera